The Jacksonville Indians were a minor league baseball team based in Jacksonville, Florida. They played in the Class-C Florida State League in 1921 and 1922. They were managed by George Stovall. As a 44-year-old, Stovall also played in 65 games for them. In 1921, the team first began play as the Jacksonville Scouts.

Alumni
Logan Drake
Al Niehaus
Paul Schreiber
Les Sweetland
Herb Thomas

References

Baseball teams established in 1921
Sports clubs disestablished in 1922
Defunct Florida State League teams
Baseball in Jacksonville, Florida
Defunct baseball teams in Florida
1921 establishments in Florida
1922 disestablishments in Florida
Baseball teams disestablished in 1922